Dargwa (or Dargin) may refer to:

 Dargwa people, a people of the Caucasus in southern Dagestan
 Dargwa language, their language